The Andrews Peaks are a line of rock peaks  long near the head of Arthur Glacier, situated between Mount Warner and Mount Crow in the Ford Ranges of Marie Byrd Land. They were mapped by the United States Antarctic Service (1939–41) and by the United States Geological Survey from surveys and from U.S. Navy air photos (1959–65), and were named by the  Advisory Committee on Antarctic Names for Stephen T. Andrews, a United States Antarctic Research Program ionospheric physicist, scientific leader at Byrd Station in 1969.

References 

Mountains of Marie Byrd Land